Sir Maurice Gordon Willmott  (25 February 1894 – 14 October 1977) was Chief Chancery Master in the High Court of Justice. He retired in 1959. He was the holder of the Military Cross.

References

External links 
http://discovery.nationalarchives.gov.uk/details/r/C1105130

1894 births
1977 deaths
People from Ealing
Knights Bachelor
Recipients of the Military Cross
King's Royal Rifle Corps officers
Masters of the High Court (England and Wales)